Jesús Toscano (born 23 September 1943) is a Mexican rower. He competed in the men's coxless four event at the 1968 Summer Olympics.

References

1943 births
Living people
Mexican male rowers
Olympic rowers of Mexico
Rowers at the 1968 Summer Olympics
Sportspeople from Guadalajara, Jalisco